girl or  woman (hangul:) is a pejorative expression used in South Korea to criticize women who "[scrimp] on essentials so they can over-spend on conspicuous luxuries". The term first entered the language after Korea's early-2000s economic upswing. According to Jee Eun Regina Song, the concept of this woman is "best exemplified by the Starbucks cup in her hand". In South Korea, Starbucks symbolizes aspirational wealth and drinking Starbucks coffee is a status symbol; Seoul as of 2015 had more franchises than any other city in the world. Coffee after 1999 became a symbol of class.

According to the BBC, the term is inherently sexist; according to Song, the issues are both of gender and class. The BBC said that the term refers to the idea that "no matter how many Chanel bags she buys, she'll never be able to disguise her 'Korean-ness', and that this kind of spending was something to be mocked. There is no derogatory 'soybean paste boy' equivalent."

 is Korean fermented soybean paste. The term mocks a woman for eating a cheap meal ( is one of the cheapest meals in Korea) so she can buy something expensive. A large part of the song "Gangnam Style" is a parody of this stereotype.

References 

2000 in South Korea
Society of South Korea
Pejorative terms for women
Satire
Humour
Jokes